European route E6 (or simply E6) is the main north-south thoroughfare through Norway as well as the west coast of Sweden. The route ends in Kirkenes close to the Russian border.

Route 

From south to north, E6 runs through Trelleborg, Malmö, Helsingborg, Halmstad, Gothenburg, Svinesund in Sweden, before crossing the border at the Svinesund Bridge into Norway. It then passes Halden, Sarpsborg, Moss to the capital Oslo. North of this, it passes by Gardermoen, Hamar, Lillehammer, Dombås, Oppdal, Melhus to  Trondheim.

Beyond Trondheim, the E6 meets Stjørdal, Verdal, Steinkjer, Grong, Mosjøen, Mo i Rana, Saltdal, Fauske and Hamarøy towards Bognes, where there is a ferry crossing over the Tysfjorden to Skarberget. It then runs through on via Narvik, Setermoen, Nordkjosbotn, Skibotn and Alta to Olderfjord, where European route E69 continues north towards Nordkapp. The E6, meanwhile, turns south towards Lakselv and Karasjok, then runs on the west bank of the Anarjohka, which forms the border with Finland. Beyond the border, it passes through Varangerbotn, and Kirkenes, where the road terminates just east of the town center.

Between Trelleborg and Kirkenes, there is a more than 800 km (500 mi) shorter route using E4 and E75, among the longest detour any European route has. In Finnmark there are several shorter alternative routes to the E6. Moreover, on the stretch from Oslo to Trondheim, following E6 strictly is a 40 km detour compared to using Norwegian National Road 3 or Norwegian National Road 4 for their applicable portions of the trip.

Features 

The road is a 2+2 lane motorway from outside Trelleborg to Moelv, about 740 km. The last Swedish part of the E6 motorway through Bohuslän were completed in 2015. This motorway is also connected to central Europe by uninterrupted motorway (via E20). Some stretches further north also have four lanes or motorway standard. The rest of the road is ordinary road, usually 6–10 m wide. The northern half of the road, north of Trondheim, is also often fairly curvy, making high speeds in such parts a possible safety hazard.

E6 passes over treeless mountain passes in a few places in Norway. In the winter, bad weather and snow storms can cause the road to be temporarily closed, though, unlike many minor roads, it is kept open wherever practical. Because the road is the main artery through the country, cyclists and leisure travellers avoid the southern sections owing to the excessive traffic. In the north traffic is sparse.

History and future plans 
This road was called E6 in the old "E" road system before 1975 and previously continued to Rome (introduced in Sweden 1962 and in Norway 1965).

It was given the number E47 (but not signposted) in the new system on most of the Scandinavian part (Helsingborg–Olderfjord), and E6 only for the northernmost  (from Olderfjord in Finnmark). After a political negotiation, the whole part passing through Scandinavia was given the number E6 in the new system, introduced in Scandinavia in 1992. The part Trelleborg-Helsingborg was never intended to be part of E47. E47 connects to E4 at the Helsingør-Helsingborg ferry, and E4 and E6 connect just outside Helsingborg.

The E6 became 4-lane motorway all the way from Trelleborg to Kolomoen (near Hamar) in 2015, although the road is sometimes wider. The new Svinesund Bridge opened in 2005, replacing an earlier and narrower bridge from 1946.

In 2012-2018 the road was shortened by 39 km between Narvik and Alta, by building the Hålogaland Bridge and more bridges and tunnels.

60 kilometre road between Moelv and Øyer is under conversion to 4-lane motorway, set to be finished around 2025.

In Trøndelag, several sections north and south of Trondheim are under construction, or planned as motorways, this project is planned to be 106 kilometers long and it will go from the junction with Norwegian National Road 3 at Ulsberg in the south to Åsen north of Trondheim Airport, Værnes, set to be finished in 2027/2028, it will be financed by the state owned company Nye Veier.

On 8 June 2022, a damaged fairly short bridge (at Badderen), that gave a 163 km detour between Tromsø and Alta, got a temporary bridge installed (over the damaged bridge) after a week interruption.

References

External links 
 UN Economic Commission for Europe: Overall Map of E-road Network (2007)

06
E0006
E0006
E0006

E0006
E0006
E0006
Roads within the Arctic Circle